The estimated sign, also referred to as the e-mark or  can be found on most prepacked products in the European Union (EU). Its use indicates that the prepackage fulfils EU Directive 76/211/EEC, which specifies the maximum permitted tolerances in package content. The shape and dimensions of the e-mark are defined in EU Directive 2009/34/EC. The e-mark is also used on prepackages in the United Kingdom, Australia and South Africa.

The scope of the directive is limited to prepackages that have a predetermined nominal weight of between 5 g and 10 kg or volume of 5 ml and 10 L, are filled without the purchaser present, and in which the quantity cannot be altered without opening or destroying the packing material.

The estimated sign indicates that:
 the average quantity of product in a batch of prepackages shall not be less than the nominal quantity stated on the label;
 the proportion of individual prepackages having a negative error greater than the tolerable negative error shall be sufficiently small for batches of prepackages to satisfy the requirements of the official reference test as specified in legislation;
 none of the prepackages marked have a negative error greater than twice the tolerable negative error (since no such prepackage may bear the sign).

The tolerable negative error is related to the nominal quantity and varies between 9 per cent on prepackages nominally 50 g or 50 ml or less, to 1.5 per cent on prepackages nominally 1 kilogram or 1 litre or more. The tolerable error decreases as nominal quantity increases, and is done by alternating intervals where there is a percentage error and intervals where there is a fixed error (and thus over those intervals the percentage error decreases).

The sign looks like a stylised lowercase "e" and its shape, is precisely defined by European Union Directive 2009/34/EC. It must be placed in the same field of vision as the nominal quantity. The sign has been added to the Unicode list of characters at position U+212E.

The estimated sign may be printed on a prepackage if:
 the quantity of product in the prepackage and its labelling meet the requirements, and
 the packer either measures the quantity of product of each package while filling or carries out production checks in accordance with procedures recognized by the competent departments in the member state, and
 the packer holds at the disposal of those departments documents containing the results of such checks and corrections and adjustments as have been shown to be necessary.

Tolerable negative error 

Error tolerance decreases as nominal quantity increases, by alternating intervals of a given percentage error with intervals of a given amount error: these interpolate between the stepwise decreases in percentage error.

The estimated sign indicates that the average quantity of product in a batch of prepackages is not less than the nominal quantity stated on the label.

{| class="wikitable" style="text-align:center"
|+Table of tolerable negative errors
|-
! Nominal quantityin g or ml
!Tolerable negativeerror
|-
| 5–50 ||9%
|-
| 50–100 ||4.5 units
|-
| 100–200 ||4.5%
|-
| 200–300 ||9 units
|-
| 300–500 ||3%
|-
| 500–1000 ||15 units
|-
| 1000–10000 ||1.5%
|}
When using the table, the values of the tolerable negative errors shown as percentages in the table, calculated in units of weight or volume, shall be rounded up to the nearest 0.1 g or 0.1 ml.

See also
 E (Ecco2k album)
 CE marking (stylized )
 EC identification and health marks

References

External links 
Evertype article
Council Directive of 20 January 1976 on the approximation of the laws of the Member States relating to the making-up by weight or by volume of certain prepackaged products

Symbols
EN standards